Lazare de Baïf (1496–1547) was a French diplomat and humanist. His natural son, Jean-Antoine de Baïf, was born in Venice, while Lazare was French ambassador there.

He published a translation of the Electra of Sophocles in 1537, and afterwards a version of the Hecuba. He was an elegant writer of Latin verse, and is commended by Joachim du Bellay as having introduced certain valuable words into the French language.

References

External links
 

1496 births
1547 deaths
People from Sarthe
16th-century French writers
16th-century male writers
French classical scholars
French Renaissance humanists
16th-century French diplomats
French translators
French male non-fiction writers